György Kunsági (12 March 1934 – 6 September 2007) was a Hungarian breaststroke swimmer who won a silver medal at the 1958 European Aquatics Championships. He competed in two events at the 1960 Summer Olympics, but did not reach the finals.

References

1934 births
2007 deaths
Swimmers at the 1960 Summer Olympics
Olympic swimmers of Hungary
Hungarian male swimmers
European Aquatics Championships medalists in swimming
Male breaststroke swimmers
Swimmers from Budapest
20th-century Hungarian people
21st-century Hungarian people